Javier Álvarez Fuentes (born May 8, 1956 in Mexico City) is a Mexican composer who is known for creating works that combine a variety of international musical styles and traditions, and that often utilize unusual instruments and new music technologies. Álvarez is one of the best-known Mexican composers of his generation, and many of the works in his prolific oeuvre combine music technology with diverse instruments and influences from all around the world.

Life and career

Born in Mexico City in 1956, Álvarez studied clarinet and musical composition with Mario Lavista in Mexico before moving to the United States in the early 1980s and subsequently, to Great Britain, where he attended the Royal College of Music and the City University in London. His first electroacoustic music dates from his time at the University of London, such as Temazcal (1984). In this contemporary classic, Álvarez unexpectedly pits a pair of maracas against a complex electroacoustic backdrop. Mannam (1992) takes its inspiration from the other side of the globe and an ancient Korean zither called a kayagum. Winner of a 1993 Prix Ars Electronica distinction, Mannam blends and juxtaposes elements of Korean music with materials and performance techniques drawn from the Mexican folk harp. Offrande (2001), a more recent work, offers an intriguing mix of Caribbean steel pans and electronically processed rhythmic patterns.

Several of Alvarez's works incorporate elements from Latin American dance genres, such as Mambo. In Mambo a la Braque (1991), he creates an electroacoustic collage of musical segments drawn from Cuban mambo composer Dámaso Perez Prado's “Caballo Negro” (Black Horse). On a larger scale, Alvarez's Papalotl (1987), for piano and electroacoustic sounds, refers to the wider world of dance through its use of complex rhythmic patterns in a carefully synchronized duet between pianist and electroacoustics. The resulting vibrant toccata won its composer the 1987 ICEM Prize in Paris and awards from the Bourges International Festival and Austria's Prix Ars Electronica. Amongst his orchestral and concerti output, Geometría Foliada (2003), written as a concerto for the Cuarteto Latinoamericano, reminisces on the vernacular but assimilates its influences in an evocative self-invented imaginary folklore.

Alvarez's compositions have been performed throughout the world by renowned orchestras such as the Chicago Symphony Orchestra, the London Sinfonietta, the Los Angeles Philharmonic, the Mexico City Philharmonic, and the Orchestre National de France, among others. He also composed the music for Guillermo del Toro's acclaimed 1993 horror film Cronos.

A graduate of the Royal College of Music and City University London, Álvarez has received numerous prizes and honors including a Mendelssohn Scholarship, the Lionel Robbins Award, a Gemini Fellowship, the ICEM Prize (1987), Austria's Prix Ars Electronica (1993), and awards at the Bourges International Festival. From 1993 to 1999, he was a Fellow of the Mexican Endowment for the Arts and Culture. He was a founding member of Sonic Arts Network and served as the artistic director of the Society for the Promotion of New Music in 1993. He has been a member of the music faculties of the City University London, the Guildhall School of Music and Drama, the Malmö Music Academy, the Royal College of Music, and the University of Hertfordshire.

After 25 years living in England, Alvarez returned to Mexico where he became the founding director of the Musical Arts Department of the Escuela Superior de Artes de Yucatán. After a period serving as Dean of the Conservatorio de Las Rosas in Morelia, Michoacán, he resided in Mérida, in Yucatan, combining activities as a freelance composer and project animateur.

Music works

Solo and chamber works
 Ki Bone Gaku (1984) trombone and marimba 12’
 Lluvia de Toritos (1984) solo flute 9’
 Chaconna (1991) viola and harpsichord 5’
 Ayara (1981) bassoon and string quartet 22’
 Caracteristicas (1982) flt.ob.vc and piano 9’
 Tientos (1985) flt.(picc) clt. vln, vc and piano 11’
 Quemar las Naves (1988-rev91) ssax, trumpet, trombone, bass guitar, piano, drums and hand percussion 15’
 Metro Chabacano (1991) string quartet 7’
 Acordeón de Roto Corazón (1994) saxophone quartet 7’
 Metro Taxqueña (1994) string quartet 8’
 Serpiente y Escalera (1995) cello and piano 10’
 Metro Nativitas (1999) string quartet 8’
 Nocturno y Toque(1997) Two steel pans and 2 marimbas 13’
 Modelo para Armar (2000) Ssax, asax, bsax, baroque guitars (2) and 2 perc. 15’
 Estudio # 5 (2002) Tenor steel pan 7’
 n mambo (2001) piano 3’
 Triple enclave (2004) piano 7’
 Trompatufarria al Pastor (2005) French horn quartet 4’

Large chamber ensembles
 Recintos (1981) wind ensemble 24’
 Metro Chabacano (1987) string orchestra 7’
 Mantis Walk in Metal Space (2003) Percussion soloist, instrumental ensemble [ flt, 2 clts, 2 hrns, 2 trbs, tuba, piano, 2 vlns, cello and double bass ], Real time electronics and electroacoustic sounds 20’
 Metal de Corazones (2012) Instrumental ensemble (tpt, clt, bclt, vln, vla, vc, piano, perc & perc quartet) 15’

Soloist and orchestra
 Trireme (1983) French horn and orchestra 18’
 Música para piel y palangana (1993) percussion and orchestra 23’
 Geometría Foliada (2002) String quartet and orchestra 19’
 Jardines con Palmera (2012) Perc and orchestra 12'
 La Ceiba de Sol y Luna (2013) Bassoon and orchestra 18'

Orchestra
 Gramática de Dos (1991) 14’

Voice and instruments
 Canciones de la Venta (1977) soprano, vln,vla and Mexican jarana or baroque guitar Text in Spanish by Jose Carlos Becerra 8’
 Tres ranas contra reloj (1981) soprano (col), vln, vc, and piano (vocalise) 17’
 Fragmentos de Hueso (1984) soprano, flt. ssax, bclt and viola Text in Nahuatl and English 9’
 Animal Crackers (1990) 2 sopranos and baritone, viola and piano Text in English by Jo Shapcott 9’
 Días como Sombra (2010) 2 sopranos, alto and baritone, and percussion quartet

Choir and ensemble / orchestra
 Te espera esa Chispa (1982)
 Calacas Imaginarias (1994)
 Amor es mas Laberinto (1978)
 Días como Sombra (2010) SATB choir and percussion quartet

Opera
 Mambo (1989-2001)

Electroacoustic
 Temazcal (1984) amplified maracas and electroacoustic sounds 8’
 The Panama Files (1986) electroacoustic sounds 4’ [in collaboration with In Dearden]
 Papalotl (1987) piano and electroacoustic sounds 13’
 Edge Dance (1987) electroacoustic sounds 3’ [in collaboration with In Dearden]
 On going on (1987) baritone saxophone and electroacoustic sounds 11’
 Asi el acero (1988) amplified tenor steelpan and electroacoustic sounds 9’
 Acuerdos por Diferencia (1989) harp and electroacoustic sounds 12’
 Mambo à la Braque (1990) electroacoustic sounds 3’
 Shekere (2001) shekere gourd, and live control system 10’
 Mannam (1992) kayagum (Korean zither) and electroacoustic sounds 14’
 Mambo Vinko (1993) trombone and electroacoustic sounds 15’
 Pyramid (1996) any number of instruments and electroacoustic sounds 5-8’
 Calacas Imaginarias (1994)
 Overture (1995) electroacoustic sounds 1’
 Offrande (2000) tenor and baritone steel pans + ea sounds 18’
 Recycle loops (2002) for young percussion players & electroacoustic sounds
 Cylinder clouds (2002) Installation for three flutes & electroacoustic sounds 24’
 Cactus Geometries (2002) electroacoustic sounds 19’
 Le repas du Serpent & Retour a la Raison (2004) cello, video and electroacoustic sounds 9’
 Negro Fuego y Cruzado (2008) Two bass clarinets, video and electroacoustic sounds 11’
 De tus manos brotan pájaros (2010) bassoon and electroacoustic sounds 13’

Film and dance
 CRONOS (aka The Cronos Device, La Invención de Cronos)
Feature. Directed by Guillermo del Toro. Produced by Iguana Producciones and Ventana Films. Mexico and Los Angeles 1992. Prix de la Critique, Cannes 1993.
 TID-TUG
Animation. Directed by William Latham. Produced by the Royal College of Art, London 1985.
 THE EMPIRE OF FORM
Computer Animation by William Latham. Produced by the Royal College of Art, London 1987.
 APPEARANCE
Composed for Sue Maclennan and Dancers. London. Commissioned by the Arts Council of Great Britain and produced by Sue Maclennan and Dancers and Chisenhale Dance Space. London. 1988.

References

External links 
 http://www.temazcal.co.uk

1956 births
Living people
Mexican male classical composers
Mexican classical composers
Musicians from Mexico City
National Conservatory of Music of Mexico alumni
Academics of City, University of London
Academics of the Guildhall School of Music and Drama
Academics of the Royal College of Music
Academics of the University of Hertfordshire
Alumni of the Royal College of Music
Alumni of City, University of London
Mexican film score composers
Male film score composers
Mendelssohn Prize winners